is a town located in Saitama Prefecture, Japan. , the town had an estimated population of 11,192 in 4657 households and a population density of 65 persons per km2. Parts of the town are within the borders of the Chichibu-Tama-Kai National Park.

Geography
Ogano is located in the mountainous far western Saitama Prefecture, surrounded by the city of Chichibu on the north, east and south and by Gunma Prefecture to the west.

Surrounding municipalities
Saitama Prefecture
 Chichibu
Gunma Prefecture
 Kanna
 Ueno

Climate
Ogano has an oceanic climate (Köppen Cfb) characterized by warm summers and cool winters with light snowfall. The average annual temperature in Ogano is 10.4 °C. The average annual rainfall is 2222 mm with September as the wettest month. The temperatures are highest on average in August, at around 21.9 °C, and lowest in January, at around minus 1.2 °C.

Demographics
Per Japanese census data, the population of Ogose has declined at an accelerating rate in recent decades.

History
The town of Ogano was created within Chichibu District, Saitama with the establishment of the modern municipalities system on April 1, 1889, and annexed the neighboring village of Nagawaka on April 1, 1955, followed by the villages of Mitagawa and Kurao on March 31, 1956.  On October 1, 2005 the village of Ryōkami was merged into Ogano.

Government
Ogano has a mayor-council form of government with a directly elected mayor and a unicameral town council of 12 members. Ogano, together with the towns of Higashichichibu, Minano, Nagatoro and Yokoze, contributes one member to the Saitama Prefectural Assembly. In terms of national politics, the town is part of Saitama 11th district of the lower house of the Diet of Japan.

Economy
Ogano is largely a bedroom community due to its proximity to the city of Chichibu.

Education
Ogano has four public elementary schools and one public middle school operated by the town government, and one public high school operated by the Saitama Prefectural Board of Education..

Transportation

Railway
Ogano has no passenger rail service. The nearest station is Chichibu Station, in the neighboring city of Chichibu.

Highway

Local attractions
 Mount Ryōkami (one of the 100 Famous Japanese Mountains)
Chichibu 34 Kannon Sanctuary
Chichibu Muse Park

References

External links

Official Website 

Towns in Saitama Prefecture
Chichibu District, Saitama
Ogano, Saitama